, is one of the original 40 throws of Judo as developed by Jigoro Kano.
It belongs to the second group, Dai Nikyo, of the traditional throwing list, Gokyo (no waza), of Kodokan Judo. It is also part of the current 67 Throws of Kodokan Judo. It is classified as a hand technique, Te-waza.

References 
 Ohlenkamp, Neil (2006) Judo Unleashed basic reference on judo. .

External links 
 Information on the Techniques of Judo.

Further reading

Judo technique
Throw (grappling)